Anterior iliac spine may refer to:

Anterior superior iliac spine
Anterior inferior iliac spine

See also
Iliac spine